Mammillaria deherdtiana is a species of cactus in the subfamily Cactoideae. It is native to South-western Mexico, in particular to Oaxaca, in a region between Nejaba, Juquila, Mixes.

References

Plants described in 1969
deherdtiana